Rautjärvi Church was a 1881 completed wooden church in Rautjärvi, Finland. It was destroyed by fire on  Christmas Day 2022. The church was set on fire during the morning service by an elderly man who was later found dead. Before the arson, the church was listed as one of the regionally significant cultural environments in South Karelia.

References 

Rautjärvi
Buildings and structures in South Karelia
Lutheran churches in Finland
Religious buildings and structures completed in 1881
Former churches in Finland